This list is intended to include all significant botanical gardens and arboretums in the United States.

The total number  of Botanical Gardens recorded in the United States of America depends on the criteria used and is in the range from 296 to 1014.

The Approximate number of living plant accessions recorded in these botanical gardens — 600,000.

The Approximate number of taxa in these collections — 90,000 taxa or approximately 40,000 species.

Estimated percentage of collections in existence before Convention on Biological Diversity — 70%

Alabama

Alaska

Arizona

Arkansas

California

Colorado

Connecticut

Delaware

Washington, D.C.

Florida

Georgia

Guam

Hawaiʻi

Idaho

Illinois

Indiana

Iowa

Kansas

Kentucky

Louisiana

Maine

Maryland

Massachusetts

Michigan

Minnesota

Mississippi

Missouri

Montana

Nebraska

Nevada

New Hampshire

New Jersey

New Mexico

New York

North Carolina

North Dakota

Ohio

Oklahoma

Oregon

Pennsylvania

Puerto Rico

Rhode Island

South Carolina

South Dakota

Tennessee

Texas

U.S. Virgin Islands

Utah

Vermont

Virginia

Washington

West Virginia

Wisconsin

Wyoming

See also
 List of botanical gardens
 Plant Collections Network
 National Register of Champion Trees
 Tourist attractions in the United States
 Lists of tourist attractions

References 

Botanical gardens
United States
Botanical Garden
botanical gardens and arboretums